The VT220 is a computer terminal introduced by Digital Equipment Corporation (DEC) in November 1983. The VT240 added monochrome ReGIS vector graphics support to the base model, while the VT241 did the same in color. The 200 series replaced the successful VT100 series, providing more functionality in a much smaller unit with a much smaller and lighter keyboard. Like the VT100, the VT200 series implemented a large subset of ANSI X.364. Among its major upgrades was a number of international character sets, as well as the ability to define new character sets.

The VT200 series was extremely successful in the market. Released at $1,295, but later priced at $795, the VT220 offered features, packaging and price that no other serial terminal could compete with at the time. In 1986, DEC shipped 165,000 units, giving them a 42% market share, double that of the closest competitor, Wyse. Competitors adapted by introducing similar models at lower prices, leading DEC to do the same by releasing the less-expensive $545 VT300 series in 1987. By that time, DEC had shipped over one million VT220s.

Hardware
The VT220 improved on the earlier VT100 series of terminals with a redesigned keyboard, much smaller physical packaging, and a much faster microprocessor. The VT220 was available with CRTs that used white, green, or amber phosphors.

The VT100s, like the VT50s before them, had been packaged in relatively large cases that provided room for expansion systems. The VT200s abandoned this concept, and wrapped the much smaller 1980s-era electronics tightly around the CRT. The result was a truncated pyramidal case with the apex at the back, only slightly larger than the CRT. This made it much easier to fit the terminal on a desk. An adjustable stand allowed the angle of the CRT to be adjusted up and down. Because it was lower than head height, the result was an especially ergonomic terminal.

The LK201 keyboard supplied with the VT220 was one of the first full-length, low-profile keyboards available; it was developed at DEC's Roxbury, Massachusetts facility. It was much smaller and lighter than the VT100s version, and connected to the terminal using a lighter and more flexible coiled cable and a telephone jack connector.

The VT200s were the last DEC terminals to provide a 20mA current loop serial interface, an older standard originally developed for the telegraph system but became popular on computers due to the early use of Teletype Model 33's as ad hoc terminals. A standard 25-pin D-connector was also provided for RS-232. Only one of the two ports could be in use at a given time. Later DEC terminals would replace both of these with their proprietary Modified Modular Jack (MMJ) connectors.

Software
The VT220 was designed to be compatible with the VT100, but added features to make it more suitable for an international market. This was accomplished by including a number of different character sets that could be selected among using a series of ANSI commands.

Glyphs were formed within a 10 by 10 grid. The terminal shipped with a total of 288 characters in its ROM, each one formed from an 8 by 10 pixel glyph. Using only 8 of the columns left space between the characters. The characters included the 96 printable ASCII characters, 67 Display Controls, 32 DEC Special Graphics, and a backward question mark used to represent undefined characters.

The VT200s included the ability to make minor changes to the character set using the National Replacement Character Set (NRCS) concept. When operating on an 8-bit clean link up to 256 character codes were available, which included a full set of European characters. But when operating on a typical 7-bit link, only 128 were available, and only 96 of these produced display output as the rest were control characters. This was not enough characters to handle all European languages. Most terminals solved this by shipping multiple complete character sets in ROM, but there was a cost in doing so.

DEC's solution to this problem, NRCS, allowed individual characters glyphs in the base set of 96 7-bit characters to be swapped out. For instance, the British set made a single substitution, replacing the US's hash character, with the pound sign, . The terminal included 14 such replacement sets, most of which swapped out about a dozen characters. This eliminated the need to ship 14 versions of the terminal, or to include 14 different 7-bit character sets in ROM.

Additionally, the VT200s allowed for another 96 characters in the Dynamically Redefined Character Set (DRCS), which could be downloaded from the host computer. Data for the glyphs was sent by encoding a set of six vertical pixels into a single character code, and then sending many of these Sixels to the terminal, which decoded them into the character set memory. In later models, the same sixel concept would be used to send bitmapped graphics as well. Character graphics were a common example of these downloaded sets.

ESCape Key controversy
Prior to the VT220, if an Escape key was present, it was positioned in the upper left corner of the keyboard. The VT220 moved it to the typical location for the f11 key, in the middle of the top row of keys. For users of the TECO editor, in which it is heavily used, this was inconvenient.

Legacy
In 1983-1984, during the design phase of the Model M keyboard, the VT220 was a new and very popular product. IBM's design team chose to emulate its LK201 keyboard layout. Key innovations that IBM copied were the inverted-T shape of the arrow cluster, the navigation keys above it, and the numeric keypad off to its right.

Eventually the popularity of the IBM PC would lead to the Model M layout becoming standardized by ANSI and ISO. Through those standards, minor variations of the VT220's keyboard layout have dominated keyboard design ever since.

See also
 ANSI escape code
 Rainbow 100
 Vttest - VT100 / VT220 / XTerm Test Utility

References

External links
Kermit 95 VT220 / VT320 Function Key Mapping
VT220 workstation operating modes
ECMA-48 Control Functions for Coded Character Sets

DEC computer terminals
Character-oriented terminal
Computer-related introductions in 1983